Scotopteryx coelinaria is a species of moth in the family Geometridae. It is found in Portugal, Spain, Andorra and the French Pyrenees.

The wingspan is 28–34 mm. The ground colour is brownish. Adults are on wing from June to July in one generation per year.

The larvae have been recorded feeding on Genista species.

References

Literature
 J. Culot: Noctuelles et Géomètres d'Europe, Deuxième Partie, Géomètres, Genève (Suisse), Villa-Les-Iris – Grand-Pré, Mars 1917
 Lionel Tauraud : Contribution à la connaissance en France de Scotopteryx coelinaria (Graslin, 1863) (Lep. Geometridae). Oreina n°4, mars 2009

External links
 Lepiforum.de
 Entomologenportal.de

Moths described in 1863
Scotopteryx
Moths of Europe
Taxa named by Adolphe Hercule de Graslin